José Maria Soto Alfaro (1860-1931) was a surgeon and Costa Rican politician, brother of President Bernardo Soto Alfaro. Soto studied medicine at the University of Paris in 1885, practiced the first gastrostomy, thyroidectomy and cesarean section in Costa Rica. He practiced medicine at the Faculty of Medicine of Costa Rica and at the San Juan de Dios Hospital. sometimes deputy in the Constitutional Congress (Costa Rican parliament at the time). Convinced tinoquista, he strongly supported the brief regime of two years imposed by the brothers Tinoco after the coup d'etat of 1917 and founded the "January 27 Club" in commemoration of the date of overthrow of Alfredo González Flores. After Federico Tinoco was overthrown and his brother José Joaquín was assassinated, Soto accepted to run as a presidential candidate against the opposition leader Don Julio Acosta García, although the nomination was merely symbolic since Acosta had the triumph assured it was important to avoid a single candidate election, something that it is recognized as a patriotic service.

References

Costa Rican surgeons
Costa Rican politicians
1860 births
1931 deaths
19th-century Costa Rican people